Toppenish High School(Top-Hi) is a public high school in Toppenish, Washington. It is a part of the Toppenish School District in Yakima County.

Demographics
In October 2019 the student population was identified as 86.8% Hispanic, 9.9% American Indian/Alaska Native, 2.2% White and 1.1% other. 97.9% of students graduated in four years.

Awards
The school earned a silver medal in U.S. News & World Report's annual ranking of American high schools in 2008. Additional awards followed, making the high school the most decorated in Washington State during a five-year period.

 2010 Recipient of a Washington Achievement Award (Language Arts)  
 2011 Engineering Program nationally certified
 2011 Recipient of Washington Achievement Awards in four areas (Excellence, Language Arts, Extended Graduation Rate, and Improvement)  
 2012 Washington State STEM Lighthouse School 
 2012 KCTS 9 Stanley O. McNaughton Golden Apple Award for Excellence in Education  
 2013 Recipient of a Washington Achievement Award (High Progress)   
 2013 KCTS 9 (Seattle) Golden Apple “Pathways to Excellence” School

Sports
Toppenish High School plays in the South Central Athletic Conference (SCAC) as a size 1A school. Sports offered include football, golf, volleyball, basketball, soccer, wrestling, track and field, swimming, and tennis.

Toppenish is well known for their extremely successful wrestling program. The boys wrestling team has taken home state championships in 1991, 1993, 1998, 2016, 2017, 2019, 2020, 2022 and 2023.

References

High schools in Yakima County, Washington
Public high schools in Washington (state)